Étienne-Hippolyte Godde (26 December 1781 – 1869) was a French neoclassic architect.

Born in Breteuil, Oise, educated at the École nationale supérieure des Beaux-Arts, and Architect of the City of Paris from 1813 to 1830, Godde designed some thirty religious buildings, six public buildings, and numerous other structures.  Among his apprentices was Henri Labrouste.  In poverty later in life, he was buried in the 27th division of Père Lachaise Cemetery.

Work 

 Church of Boves in Picardie, 1805-1818
 restructuring of the Abbey of Saint-Germain-des-Prés between 1819 and 1827
 Notre-Dame de Bonne-Nouvelle, Paris, 2nd arrondissement, 1823-1829
 the chapel and the gate of Père Lachaise Cemetery in Paris, 1823-1825
 Church of St. Pierre du Gros Caillou, in Paris, 7th arrondissement, 1829
 Church of St. Denys du Saint-Sacrement in Paris, 3rd arrondissement, with pediment sculpture by Jean-Jacques Feuchère, 1835
 restoration of the Church of Saint-Germain l'Auxerrois, Paris, 1st arrondissement, 1838-1848 
 Enlargement of Saint Elizabeth of Hungary Church, Paris
 expansion and renovation of Église Saint-Philippe-du-Roule, Paris, 8th arrondissement, 1846
 Cathédrale Sainte-Croix-Saint-Jean-des-Arméniens, 1855
 Old Seminary of St. Sulpice in Paris
 Part of the old Hotel de Ville in Paris (destroyed during the Commune) in collaboration with Jean-Baptiste Lesueur
 reconstruction work at Amiens Cathedral

References 

1781 births
1869 deaths
19th-century French architects
Burials at Père Lachaise Cemetery
Chevaliers of the Légion d'honneur